Kılköy is a village in the Nazımiye District, Tunceli Province, Turkey. The village is populated by Kurds of the Alan tribe and had a population of 60 in 2021.

The hamlets of Ahırdede, Bekçiler, Harman, Kapaklı, Saka, Sığırcık and Süleyman are attached to the village.

References 

Villages in Nazımiye District
Kurdish settlements in Tunceli Province